Yichun Lindu Airport  is an airport serving the city of Yichun in northeast China's Heilongjiang Province. It started operations in August 2009, and is capable of serving 142,000 passengers a year. It replaced the old airport (ZYYC) which was near the center of Yichun (47°43'00.0"N 128°49'55.0"E).

In August 2010, the crash of Henan Airlines Flight 8387 occurred at the airport which killed 44.

Airlines and destinations

See also

List of airports in China
List of the busiest airports in China

References

Airports in Heilongjiang
2009 establishments in China
Airports established in 2009